Into the Wind is a 2022 Polish film directed by Kristoffer Rus in his feature film debut, written by Julian Kijowski and starring Sonia Mietielica and Jakub Sasak.

Cast
 Sonia Mietielica as Ania
 Jakub Sasak as Michal
 Bitamina
 Sonia Bohosiewicz
 Jakub Czachor
 Sebastian Dela
 Karol Dziuba
 Wojciech Gassowski
 Waleria Gorobets
 Jakub Kuzia
 Grzegorz Malecki
 Marta Ojrzynska
 Ilona Ostrowska
 Marcin Perchuc
 Wlodzimierz Press
 Kornelia Strzelecka
 Agnieszka Zulewska

References

External links
 
 

2022 films
2022 directorial debut films
2020s Polish-language films
Polish-language Netflix original films